Franz "Frank" Brugger, OBE (7 March 1927 — 27 February 2000) was a New Zealand businessman known for his car parts factory in Wainuiomata and production of a highly efficient wood burning stove. He was born in Rottemann, Austria on 7 March 1927 and died in Wainuiomata, New Zealand on 27 February 2000.

Brugger obtained a degree in industrial management at Rottemann University. He emigrated from Austria to New Zealand in 1956. After working for Mobil, he set up his own welding business in Petone. Noting that car assembly plants were required to increase the amount of locally manufactured components, he took the opportunity and built a factory in Wainuiomata in 1970. Wainuiomata at the time was growing rapidly and a number of Brugger's staff already lived there.  Brugger Industries made many components for cars, including car seats, panels, floor coverings, head linings and sun-visors.

Further operations were set up in Auckland, Dunedin and Levin and he also set up an engineering business in Samoa where he had the honorary title of Toleafoa.  Brugger represented New Zealand on trade delegations to Switzerland, Germany and Japan.

In 1985 he received an Air New Zealand Enterprise Award. He received an OBE in 1986 for services to industry, export and the community. Brugger retired in 1986 and died in 2000.

References

New Zealand Members of the Order of the British Empire
1927 births
2000 deaths